Anadoras grypus is a species of thorny catfish found in the upper Amazon basin of Ecuador, Peru, Colombia, and Bolivia. This species grows to a length of  SL.

References 

Doradidae
Catfish of South America
Fish of the Amazon basin
Fish of Bolivia
Freshwater fish of Colombia
Freshwater fish of Ecuador
Freshwater fish of Peru
Taxa named by Edward Drinker Cope
Fish described in 1872